Robbers' Roost is a 1932 American Pre-Code Western film directed by David Howard and Louis King and written by Dudley Nichols. The film stars George O'Brien and Maureen O'Sullivan. It is based on the novel Robbers' Roost by Zane Grey. The film premiered in September 13 to early November or December 30, 1932, and was released on January 1, 1933, by Fox Film Corporation.

The film was remade in 1955 under the same title, Robbers' Roost, with George Montgomery and Richard Boone.

Plot

Cast       
George O'Brien as Jim Wall
Maureen O'Sullivan as Helen Herrick
Walter McGrail as Henchman Brad
Maude Eburne as Aunt Ellen
Reginald Owen as Cecil Herrick
William Pawley as Hank Hays
Clifford Santley as Happy Jack 
Robert Greig as Tulliver the Butler

References

External links 
 
 

1932 Western (genre) films
1932 films
American black-and-white films
American Western (genre) films
Films based on works by Zane Grey
Fox Film films
Films based on American novels
Films directed by David Howard
Films directed by Louis King
Films produced by Sol Lesser
Films with screenplays by Dudley Nichols
1930s English-language films
1930s American films